Seul may refer to:

 Seoul, the capital and largest city of South Korea
 Seul, Korean name for the Se (instrument), an ancient Chinese musical instrument
 Lac Seul, a lake in Ontario, Canada
 Lac Seul First Nation, an Indian reserve on the shores of Lac Seul
 Seul (album) (2000), by Canadian singer Garou
 Seul (film) (1932), a Jean Tarride film starring René Lefèvre
 "Seul" (song) (2000), by Canadian singer Garou
 SEUL, a Linux advocacy group

See also
 Seoul (disambiguation)
 Seul Choix Light, a lighthouse located in the northwest corner of Lake Michigan in Schoolcraft County, Michigan
 Seul contre tous, a 1998 French film by Gaspar Noé